Hot Tomato (call sign: 4HTB) is a radio station (102.9 FM) on the Gold Coast, Queensland, Australia.

The current breakfast line-up consists of Paul "Galey" Gale, teamed with Emily Jade O'Keefe and David "Christo" Christopher. The local drive home was hosted by Simon Baggs and Moyra Major, who previously worked together at Sea FM before Simon Baggs farewelled the drive shift on November 2, 2021.

From January 2022 Baggs replacement is 1029er and Big Brother million dollar winner Trevor "Big Trev" Butler. The show will be known as Moyra and Big Trev for the local drive home. The Street Team will continue without Big Trev.

Major and Baggs won a 2020/21 ACRA for Best Music Special for their live broadcast on Facebook and radio from the runway of Gold Coast Airport during the height of the COVID-19 pandemic as the airport was closed.

Gale, O'Keeffe and Christo won Best On-Air Team (Provincial) for most popular Breakfast line-up.

A key point of difference between Hot Tomato and the other Gold Coast radio stations is that all shows originate and are broadcast from the local region, there is no networking, the station is 100% Gold Coast.

Hot Tomato was the first radio station in Queensland to use the limited inventory concept, getting around the Nova trademark by calling it "only ever two ads in a row." Hot Tomato also prides itself on an active local newsroom delivering on-the-hour news updates and runs a local website called myGC which have news from the Gold Coast, Australia and the world, events on the Coast and more. The first song played on Hot Tomato was The Rolling Stones' "Sympathy for the Devil". In November 2018 Hot Tomato was purchased by Grant Broadcasters.

In November 2021, Hot Tomato, along with other stations owned by Grant Broadcasters, were acquired by the Australian Radio Network. This deal will allow Grant's stations, including Hot Tomato, to access ARN's iHeartRadio platform in regional areas. The deal was finalized on January 4, 2022. It is expected Hot Tomato will integrate with ARN's KIIS Network, but will retain its current name according to the press release from ARN.

References

External links
 Website

Australian Radio Network
Radio stations established in 2003
Radio stations on the Gold Coast, Queensland
Adult contemporary radio stations in Australia